The PRS Pilot One is a German single-place paraglider that was designed and produced by Pilots Right Stuff (PRS) of Brannenburg. It is now out of production.

Design and development
The aircraft was designed as a simple and safe to fly DHV Level 1 glider. The models are each named for their relative size.

Variants
Pilot One S
Small-sized model for lighter pilots. The glider model is DHV 1 certified.
Pilot One M
Mid-sized model for medium-weight pilots. The glider model is DHV 1 certified.
Pilot One L
Large-sized model for heavier pilots. The glider model is DHV 1 certified.
Pilot One XL
Large-sized model for heavier pilots. The glider model is DHV 1 certified.

Specifications (Pilot One M)

See also
PRS Peak

References

Pilot One
Paragliders